Ralph Pöhland (8 June 1946 – 7 February 2011) was a German skier. He competed in the Nordic combined event at the 1972 Winter Olympics.

References

External links
 

1946 births
2011 deaths
German male Nordic combined skiers
Olympic Nordic combined skiers of West Germany
Nordic combined skiers at the 1972 Winter Olympics
People from Klingenthal
Sportspeople from Saxony